Elmore Halt railway station served the suburbs of Lee-on-Solent, Hampshire, England from 1910 to 1930 on the Lee-on-the-Solent Railway.

History 
The station opened on 11 April 1910 by the Lee-on-the-Solent Railway. It was situated on the south side of the B3333. Unlike the other two halts on the line it didn't open in 1894. The station closed temporarily on 31 August 1914 and reopened on 1 October 1914, before closing permanently on 1 May 1930.

References

External links 

Disused railway stations in Hampshire
Railway stations in Great Britain opened in 1910
Railway stations in Great Britain closed in 1930
1910 establishments in England
1930 disestablishments in England